Leighton is a hamlet in the civil parish of Healey in the Harrogate district of North Yorkshire, England. It is near Leighton Reservoir that provides for Yorkshire Water.

Notable residents
The religious prophet Martha Hatfield was from Leighton.

References

External links

Villages in North Yorkshire